Philip Roscoe (born 3 March 1934) is an English former professional footballer who played in the Football League for Halifax Town.

References

1934 births
Living people
English footballers
Association football defenders
English Football League players
Barnsley F.C. players
Halifax Town A.F.C. players
Telford United F.C. players